Altıntaş is a town and a district of Kütahya Province, Turkey.

Altıntaş (literally "golden rock") may also refer to:

 Altıntaş, Alaca
 Altıntaş, Aşkale
 Altıntaş, Bozdoğan, a village in the district of Bozdoğan, Aydın Province, Turkey
 Altıntaş, Çelikhan, a village in the district of Çelikhan, Adıyaman Province, Turkey
 Altıntaş, İliç
 Altıntaş, Kalecik, a village in the district of Kalecik, Ankara Province, Turkey
 Altıntaş, Keşan
 Altıntaş, Midyat, an Assyrian/Syriac village in the district of Midyat, Mardin Province, Turkey
 Altıntaş, Mudanya
 Altıntaş (surname), a Turkish surname (including a list of people with the name)